Thomas Moran (1837–1926) was an American painter and printmaker.

Thomas Moran may also refer to:

Thomas Moran (singer) (1876–1960), Irish ballad singer
Thomas J. Moran (businessman) (1952–2018), American businessman and humanitarian
Thomas J. Moran (judge) (1920–1995), American jurist
Thomas P. Moran, engineer at the IBM Almaden Research Center
Thomas P. Moran, President & CEO at Community Bank
Tommy Moran, leading member of the British Union of Fascists

See also
Tom Moran (disambiguation)
Thomas Moran House, East Hampton, New York